John Joseph Swartzwelder Jr. (born February 8, 1949) is an American comedy writer and novelist, best known for his work on the animated television series The Simpsons. Born in Seattle, Washington, Swartzwelder began his career working in advertising. He was later hired to work on comedy series Saturday Night Live in the mid-1980s as a writer. He later contributed to fellow writer George Meyer's short-lived Army Man magazine, which led him to join the original writing team of The Simpsons, beginning in 1989.

He worked on The Simpsons as a writer and producer until 2003, and later contributed to The Simpsons Movie. He wrote the largest number of Simpsons episodes (59 full episodes, with contributions to several others) by a large margin. After his retirement from the show, he began a career as a writer of self-published absurdist novels. He has written more than eleven novels, the most recent of which, The Spy With No Pants, was published in December 2020.

Swartzwelder is revered among comedy fans; his colleagues have called him among the best comedy writers. He is known for his reclusiveness, and gave his first media interview in 2021, 18 years after his final Simpsons episode.

Early life 
Swartzwelder was born in Seattle, Washington in 1949, the son of Gloria Mae (Matthews) and John Joseph Swartzwelder, Sr. He attended high school in Renton, Washington.

Career 
In 1983, Swartzwelder sent a joke submission to the writers of Late Night with David Letterman in 1983, which he signed but left no address. Writer Jim Downey traced Swartzwelder based on the Chicago postmark on the card via phone books at the New York Public Library. After he contacted Swartzwelder's mother in Seattle, she redirected him to her son, who was then working at an advertising agency in Chicago. Downey described Swartzwelder's interview as "one of the most spectacularly awful in history"; it consisted of him entering David Letterman's office without permission, and discussing the state of television (that it was "all shit") while smoking and drinking. He was not hired for Letterman, but Downey hired him for Saturday Night Live (SNL) beginning in 1985.

At SNL, Swartzwelder shared an office with Robert Smigel, and met George Meyer, who later proved instrumental in hiring him for The Simpsons. During his time on SNL, he became known for writing odder material. He was fired in mid-1986, which Smigel attributed to the network's pressure on show creator Lorne Michaels to make personnel changes. Meyer quit SNL and created the magazine Army Man, recruiting Swartzwelder to help write it. Meyer said of Army Man:

In 1988, Sam Simon, a reader of Army Man, recruited Swartzwelder and Meyer to write for The Simpsons. By 1994, with the show's sixth season, Swartzwelder was granted a special dispensation and allowed not to attend rewrite sessions with the rest of the staff, instead being allowed to send drafts of his scripts in from home so other writers could revise them as they saw fit. This was reportedly a result of Swartzwelder's heavy smoking coming into conflict with a newly implemented policy banning smoking in the writers' room. Swartzwelder's scripts typically needed less rewriting than those of other writers, with about 50% being used. According to Simpsons creator Matt Groening, Swartzwelder wrote Simpsons episodes sitting in a booth at a coffee shop "drinking copious amounts of coffee and smoking endless cigarettes". When California passed an anti-smoking law, Swartzwelder bought the booth and installed it in his house, allowing him to continue his process in peace. In his only interview, given to the New Yorker in 2021, Swartzwelder said he had negotiated his contract to allow him to work from home, but that this had nothing to do with smoking; he also said he bought a new booth, rather than one from the diner.

In 1996, Swartzwelder created and produced his own pilot presentation for Fox, Pistol Pete, a spoof of western films. Starring Stephen Kearney, Mark Derwin, Lisa Robin Kelly, and Brian Doyle Murray, the pilot was shot using crew from the television series Gunsmoke at Swartzwelder's insistence. John Rich, veteran television director known for The Dick Van Dyke Show, All in the Family, and Gunsmoke, directed the pilot, which was shot at Veluzat Motion Picture Ranch. Fox passed on the pilot. It eventually surfaced online in 2014.

With the exception of his contributions to The Simpsons Movie, released in 2007, Swartzwelder has been absent from The Simpsons writing staff since the fifteenth season (2003–04), with his last airing episode ("The Regina Monologues") actually being a "holdover" written for the fourteenth (2002–03) season. At 59 episodes, Swartzwelder has written more episodes than anybody else.

Since leaving The Simpsons, Swartzwelder has taken up writing absurdist novels, beginning in 2004 with the publication of science fiction detective story The Time Machine Did It starring private investigator Frank Burly. The next year he published Double Wonderful, a Western, before returning to the Burly character for How I Conquered Your Planet in 2006, The Exploding Detective in 2007, Dead Men Scare Me Stupid in 2008, Earth vs. Everybody in 2009, The Last Detective Alive in 2010, The Fifty Foot Detective in 2011, and The Million Dollar Policeman in 2012. In 2014, a children's book written in the late 1970s by Swartzwelder and illustrated by David Schutten was published by Green House Books. Swartzwelder self-publishes his books.

Political views
Swartzwelder has been referred to as a libertarian and a "hardcore conservative". He is a gun rights advocate, and despite having written many of the environmentally themed Simpsons episodes, he has been described as an "anti-environmentalist". Simpsons writer David Cohen related a story of Swartzwelder going on an extended diatribe about how there is more rainforest on Earth now than there was 100 years ago.

Reclusiveness
Swartzwelder is reclusive, and rarely makes media appearances. At one point, fans of The Simpsons debated his existence online; some theorized that "John Swartzwelder" was actually a pseudonym for when writers did not want to take credit for an episode, or for episodes that were penned by several writers in concert. Comedy writer Mike Sacks described Swartzwelder as the "Thomas Pynchon of the comedy world".

Swartzwelder declined several requests to participate in the audio commentaries on The Simpsons DVD sets. Executive producer David Mirkin once invited Swartzwelder to make a brief appearance in a prerecorded bit in which he would be asked if he wanted to take part, to which he would respond with "No" as an ironic punchline, but he refused. During the recording of the 2006 commentary for the ninth-season episode "The Cartridge Family", show runner Mike Scully called Swartzwelder's home. After presumably speaking with him for a minute, the man on the other end of the phone said, "It's too bad this really isn't John Swartzwelder." Scully and the others laughed, replied "Bye, John". After he had hung up, Scully said, "I know he's gonna sue us."

In 2016, Swartzwelder created a Twitter account. It was confirmed official by several of his former Simpsons colleagues. The account only tweets excerpts from Swartzwelder's books.

In 2021, Swartzwelder gave his only media interview, with Mike Sacks of The New Yorker. Swartzwelder said he agreed to the interview out of his fondness for The New Yorker and the writers whose work it has published. Swartzwelder said he was humbled by the praise he has received from colleagues and Simpsons fans, and that he was proud that The Simpsons encouraged fans to keep track of the writers of their favorite television shows.

Legacy
Swartzwelder is revered among comedy fans. Fellow Simpsons writers have spoken highly of his writing and impact on the show. Matt Selman wrote an article for Time about Swartzwelder, extolling him as "one of the greatest comedy minds of all time. He is the comedy writer whose words makes [sic] the best comedy writers in the world laugh out loud." George Meyer said: "Even among comedy weirdos, he stands out. He's irreplaceable." Fellow writer Dan Greaney described Swartzwelder as "the best writer in the world today in any medium".

References on The Simpsons 

Swartzwelder has been animated in the background of several episodes of The Simpsons. His animated likeness closely resembles musician David Crosby, which prompted Matt Groening to state that anytime that David Crosby appears in a scene for no apparent reason, it is really John Swartzwelder. Groening said that the appearance of the character Herman was based on Swartzwelder, with the exception of his one arm.

Filmography

Television

Film

Simpsons episodes

 The Simpsons episodes written by Swartzwelder

 "Bart the General" 
 "The Call of the Simpsons" 
 "Life on the Fast Lane" 
 "The Crepes of Wrath"
 "Treehouse of Horror"
 "Two Cars in Every Garage and Three Eyes on Every Fish"
 "Itchy & Scratchy & Marge" 
 "Bart Gets Hit by a Car" 
 "The War of the Simpsons" 
 "Bart the Murderer" 
 "Treehouse of Horror II"
 "Homer at the Bat" 
 "Dog of Death" 
 "Brother, Can You Spare Two Dimes?" 
 "Itchy & Scratchy: The Movie" 
 "Whacking Day" 
 "Krusty Gets Kancelled" 
 "Rosebud" 
 "Homer the Vigilante" 
 "Bart Gets Famous" 
 "Bart Gets an Elephant" 
 "The Boy Who Knew Too Much" 
 "Itchy & Scratchy Land" 
 "Homer the Great" 
 "Bart's Comet" 
 "Homie the Clown" 
 "Radioactive Man" 
 "Treehouse of Horror VI" (as Scary John Swartzwelder)
 "Bart the Fink"

 "Homer the Smithers" 
 "The Day the Violence Died" 
 "You Only Move Twice" 
 "Mountain of Madness" 
 "Homer vs. the Eighteenth Amendment" 
 "The Old Man and the Lisa" 
 "Homer's Enemy" 
 "The Cartridge Family" 
 "Bart Carny" 
 "King of the Hill" 
 "The Wizard of Evergreen Terrace" 
 "Homer Simpson in: 'Kidney Trouble' 
 "Homer to the Max" 
 "Maximum Homerdrive" 
 "Monty Can't Buy Me Love" 
 "Take My Wife, Sleaze" 
 "The Mansion Family" 
 "Kill the Alligator and Run" 
 "A Tale of Two Springfields" 
 "The Computer Wore Menace Shoes" 
 "Hungry, Hungry Homer" 
 "Simpson Safari" 
 "A Hunka Hunka Burns in Love" 
 "The Lastest Gun in the West" 
 "I Am Furious Yellow" 
 "The Sweetest Apu" 
 "The Frying Game" 
 "Mr. Spritz Goes to Washington" 
 "Treehouse of Horror XIV"  (as Triple Admiral John Swartzwelder)
 "The Regina Monologues"

Bibliography

The Frank Burly series

Novels 
 The Time Machine Did It (2004): 
 How I Conquered Your Planet (2006): 
 The Exploding Detective (2007): 
 Dead Men Scare Me Stupid (2008): 
 Earth vs. Everybody (2009): 
 The Last Detective Alive (2010): 
 The Fifty Foot Detective (2011): 
 The Million Dollar Policeman (2012): 
 Detective Made Easy (2013): 
 Burly Go Home (2017): 
 The Spy With No Pants (2020): ISBN 0989988546

Short stories 
 The Monster That Wouldn't Sink: (A Frank Burly Short Story) (2015)
 Earth's Biggest Fan: (A Frank Burly Short Story) (2015)

Standalones 
 Double Wonderful (2005): 
 The Animal Report (2014): 
 The Squirrel Who Saved Practically Everybody (2019):

Notes

References

Sources

External links 
 JohnSwartzwelder.com
 
 Frank Burly website

1949 births
Living people
21st-century American novelists
American humorists
American libertarians
American male novelists
American television writers
People from Renton, Washington
American male screenwriters
Novelists from Washington (state)
American male television writers
21st-century American male writers
Screenwriters from Washington (state)
21st-century American screenwriters